The 1989 Mid-American Conference men's basketball tournament took place on March 9–12, 1989 at John F. Savage Hall in Toledo, Ohio. Ball State defeated , 67–65 in the championship game, to win its second MAC Tournament title.

The Cardinals earned an automatic bid to the 1989 NCAA tournament as #9 seed in the Midwest region. In the round of 64, Ball State defeated Pittsburgh 68–64 to earn the first NCAA Tournament win in program history.

Format
All Nine conference members participated, with the top 7 teams receiving a bye to the quarterfinal round.

Bracket

References

1989
Tournament
MAC men's basketball tournament
MAC men's basketball tournament